2018 Spring Vietnam Championship Series split (2018 Spring VCS) was the first half of the 6th season of the Vietnam Championship Series, a Vietnamese professional league for League of Legends, the multiplayer online battle arena video game. It was the first VCS staging since Vietnam became independent competitive region from the Garena Premier League.

The winner of the playoffs, EVOS Esports, automatically qualified for the 2018 Mid-Season Invitational.

Format

International tournaments spots 
After becoming an independent competitive region, Vietnam got their own spots in Play-in stage of the Worlds and MSI. Also it was placed in the Rift Rivals Green Rift zone to Turkey and CIS.

Regular season 
The regular season began on January 18 and ended on March 18.

Playoffs 
The playoffs started on March 30 and ended on April 7.

Summer Promotion 
Promotion tournament for two spots in the 2018 VCS Summer was held from May 4 to May 8. Both VCS teams, FFQTV Gaming and Hall of Fame, remains in the league for the next split.

Final standings

References 

2018 in Vietnamese sport
Spring 2018 in League of Legends competitions